The following lists events that happened during 1908 in New Zealand.

Incumbents

Regal and viceregal
Head of State – Edward VII
Governor – The Lord Plunket GCMG KCVO

Government
The 16th New Zealand Parliament concluded but the Liberal Party retained in power following the 1908 General Election in November/December
Speaker of the House – Sir Arthur Guinness
Prime Minister – Joseph Ward
Minister of Finance – Joseph Ward
Attorney-General – John Findlay
Chief Justice – Sir Robert Stout

Parliamentary opposition
 Leader of the Opposition – William Massey, (Independent).

Main centre leaders
Mayor of Auckland – Arthur Myers
Mayor of Wellington – Thomas Hislop
Mayor of Christchurch – George Payling then Charles Allison
Mayor of Dunedin – John Loudon then John McDonald

Events

January

February

March

April
8 April – The Invercargill Tragedy occurs, in which James Reid Baxter kills his family and then himself.

June

July

August
 7 August: First through passenger train on the North Island Main Trunk railway, over temporary track north of Taonui, the 11-car Parliamentary Special carrying the Prime Minister Sir Joseph Ward and other parliamentarians north to see the American Great White Fleet at Auckland (9 to 15 August).

September

October

November
 6 November: The North Island Main Trunk railway linking Wellington and Auckland is completed, with the last spike driven in by Prime Minister Joseph Ward at Manganui-o-te-Ao and commemorated by the Last Spike Monument.
 9 November: A two-day NIMT rail passenger service starts, with an overnight stop at Ohakune.

December
 2 December: Dunedin Public Library opens, aided by a grant from Andrew Carnegie.
 Late December: Wanganui (population 9000) became the first provincial town to introduce trams
Undated
 Blackball, New Zealand coal miners strike for 11 weeks, an important step in the formation of the New Zealand Labour Party.
 Auckland. Three cultivars of the Feijoa are introduced into New Zealand.

Arts and literature

See 1908 in art, 1908 in literature

Books
The first Edmonds Cookery Book is published.

Music

See: 1908 in music

Film

See: 1908 in film, Cinema of New Zealand, :Category:1908 films

Sport

Boxing
The welterweight division is included in the national championships for the first time.

National amateur champions
Heavyweight – M. Ryan (Invercargill)
Middleweight – J. Smith (Auckland)
Welterweight – R. Mayze (Christchurch)
Lightweight – T. Metcalfe (Auckland)
Featherweight – W. Elliott (Timaru)
Bantamweight – J. Parker (Christchurch)

Billiards
The Auckland Sports Club, the national representative to the British Billiards Association, holds the first national championship.

 National Champion: J. Ryan (Auckland)

Chess
 The 21st National Chess Championship was held in Wellington, and was won by of A.W.O. Davies of Wellington, his second title.

Golf
 The second New Zealand Open championship was held at Balmacewen golf club and was won by 19-year-old professional J.A. Clements
 The 16th National Amateur Championships were held in Otago
 Men: H.C. Smith (Otago)
 Women: Miss ? Christie

Horse racing

Harness racing
 New Zealand Trotting Cup: Durbar
 Auckland Trotting Cup: Scotia

Thoroughbred racing
 Auckland Cup – All Red

Olympic Games
New Zealanders compete at the Olympic Games for the first time, as part of the Australasian team. Harry Kerr becomes the first New Zealander to win an Olympic medal.

Rugby league
 New Zealand national rugby league team tour of Great Britain:
 lost to Wales, 9–8
 1st test: lost to Great Britain 8–5 at Cheltenham
 2nd test: beat Great Britain 18–6 at Chelsea
 3rd test: beat Great Britain 14–6 at leeds

Rugby union
Auckland defend the Ranfurly Shield against Marlborough (32–0), Wellington (24–3), Taranaki (9–0) and Otago (11–5)

Soccer
Provincial league champions:
	Auckland:	Auckland Corinthians
	Canterbury:	Christchurch Club
	Otago:	Northern Dunedin
	Southland:	Murihiku
	Taranaki:	Hawera
	Wellington:	Diamond Wellington

Tennis
Anthony Wilding pairs with Australian Norman Brookes, as the Australasian team, to win the Davis Cup, beating the United States 3–2. The final is held in Melbourne.
Anthony Wilding, partnered with Norman Brookes, wins the men's doubles at the Wimbledon Championship

Births
 12 March: Rita Angus, painter.
 2 June: Lindsay Weir, cricketer.
 5 June: Les George, rugby player.
 19 June: Fred Baker, soldier.
 18 August: Bill Merritt, cricketer.
 21 September: Charles Upham, double Victoria Cross winner.
 25 September: Herbert Dudley Purves, medical researcher.
 26 September: John Pascoe, photographer and mountaineer 
 17 December: Sylvia Ashton-Warner, writer and educator.

Deaths
 April: Charles Rous-Marten, journalist and railway writer (b. 1842 in England) 
 20 May: Albert Henry Baskerville, rugby league pioneer (b. 1883) 
 3 August: Henry Feldwick, politician (b. 1844)
 2 October: Charles Kidson, art teacher, artist, craftsman and sculptor (b. 1867)
 8 November: Edward Connolly, politician (b. 1822)

See also
History of New Zealand
List of years in New Zealand
Military history of New Zealand
Timeline of New Zealand history
Timeline of New Zealand's links with Antarctica
Timeline of the New Zealand environment

References

External links